Krylos is a small village of Ivano-Frankivsk Raion in Ivano-Frankivsk Oblast, Ukraine. The village council consists of 16 people. Krylos belongs to Halych urban hromada, one of the hromadas of Ukraine.

History

Krylos is located on the site of the Princely city center of Halych; according to the website of Verkhovna Rada of Ukraine the settlement was founded in 898 AD. The territory of Krylos extended as far as the Limnytsia River to the west and Dniester River to the north. Immediately to the west of the Krylos settlement flows the Lukva River, which in ancient times was wider and deeper than it is today. The Lukva River served as a natural obstruction to invaders. On the east side of the Halych citadel flowed a small creek that with its valley provided an additional defensive barrier. On top of the hill where the local Assumption Cathedral displayed its stature to the surrounding landscapes, a series of tall defensive earth ramparts were built that served as the defense barriers in the past. It was a politically administrative and large religious center of White Croats.

Until 18 July 2020, Krylos belonged to Halych Raion. The raion was abolished in July 2020 as part of the administrative reform of Ukraine, which reduced the number of raions of Ivano-Frankivsk Oblast to six. The area of Halych Raion was merged into Ivano-Frankivsk Raion.

Points of interest
The majority of the archeological, architectural, and historical remnants of the former capital can be found here, which together with the Halych Historical Center and a number of other local historic locations make up the national reserve known as "Old Halych."

Krylos is now a village with remains and the partially reconstructed Assumption Church, considered to be from medieval times. Next to this church Prince Yaroslav Osmomysl was buried. A chapel has been constructed on the site of the original Assumption Church.

References

External links
 Krylos in the Encyclopedia of Ukraine, vol. 2 (1988)
Page with some pictures of Krylos
Website of the National Preserve ''Ancient Halych 
 

Villages in Ivano-Frankivsk Raion